Robert and Bertram is a 1928 German silent comedy film directed by Rudolf Walther-Fein and starring Harry Liedtke, Fritz Kampers and Elizza La Porta. The film was shot at the Staaken Studios in Berlin with sets designed by the art directors Botho Höfer and Hans Minzloff. It is based on the 1856 Gustav Räder play Robert and Bertram about the adventures of two wandering vagrants.

Cast
 Harry Liedtke as Robert Leonhard
 Fritz Kampers as Bertram Engelke
 Elizza La Porta as Melontha
 Dolly Grey as Evelyne Parker
 Carl Geppert as Greenhorn, ihr Sekretär
 Hermann Picha as Knurrhahn, Amtsvorsteher
 Fritz Greiner as Zirkusdirektor
 Alice Torning as Frau des Zirkusdirektors
 Carl Neisser as 1st Vagabond
 Franz Stein  as 2nd Vagabond

Bibliography
 Bergfelder, Tim & Bock, Hans-Michael. ''The Concise Cinegraph: Encyclopedia of German. Berghahn Books, 2009.

External links

1928 films
German comedy films
German silent feature films
1928 comedy films
Films directed by Rudolf Walther-Fein
German films based on plays
Films set in Germany
Films of the Weimar Republic
German black-and-white films
Silent comedy films
1920s German films
1920s German-language films